Easley is an unincorporated community in Boone County, in the U.S. state of Missouri. The last building remaining in Easley, a general store, was moved to the Boone County Historical Society and reconstructed. Easley is on both the Missouri River and Katy Trail.

History
A post office called Easley was established in 1893, and remained in operation until 1951. The community has the name of W. G. Easley, the original owner of the site.

References

Unincorporated communities in Boone County, Missouri
Unincorporated communities in Missouri